Morgan Township is one of thirteen townships in Owen County, Indiana, United States. As of the 2010 census, its population was 1,237 and it contained 668 housing units.

History
Morgan Township was founded in the 1820s.

Geography

Unincorporated towns
 Atkinsonville at 
 Beamer at 
 Jordan at 
(This list is based on USGS data and may include former settlements.)

Cemeteries
The township contains these three cemeteries: Olive Hill, Pleasant Grove and Spears.

Major highways
  Indiana State Road 46

Lakes
 Greybrook Lake

School districts
 Spencer-Owen Community Schools

Political districts
 State House District 46
 State Senate District 37
 State Senate District 39

References
 
 United States Census Bureau 2009 TIGER/Line Shapefiles
 IndianaMap

External links
 Indiana Township Association
 United Township Association of Indiana
 City-Data.com page for Morgan Township

Townships in Owen County, Indiana
Townships in Indiana